Cai Xukun (born August 2, 1998), better known by the mononym Kun (stylized as KUN), is a Chinese singer-songwriter, dancer and rapper. He debuted as a member of SWIN and its sub-unit SWIN-S on October 18, 2016, after participating in the first and second seasons of the Chinese reality show Super Idol. After leaving the group and its company Yihai Entertainment, he participated in iQiyi's reality survival show Idol Producer, finishing first and debuting as the leader/center of temporary Chinese boy group Nine Percent, on April 6, 2018. He is a cast member of variety show Keep Running.

Most of Kun's solo works are original, including "Wait Wait Wait" and his first EP "1". The EP was a commercial success with every song topping Chinese music charts. "Pull Up", the first track, broke 10 records and peaked at number 1 on four of QQ Music's charts as well as ranking first on Billboard China's V Chart for 8 consecutive weeks. At the time of its release in 2018, "Wait Wait Wait" debuted at number 1 on QQ Music's New Song list and Popular Music list for 10 weeks and won the title of Asia's hottest song for 4 consecutive weeks.

On January 10, 2019, Kun was officially named China's and Jamaica's Goodwill Ambassador and Outstanding Young Leader by the Jamaican Embassy in Shanghai, China. In February, Kun announced his first solo tour, "Kun ONE North America/U.K. Tour 2019", coming in early April 2019. After wrapping up the tour on July 26, Kun released his second EP titled "Young", which consists of two songs, "Young" and "Blindfolded". Upon release, the EP also did well in domestic music charts selling 110,000 copies in a week, for which he was dubbed "King of Digital Singles" of 2019.

Early life
Kun was born on August 2, 1998, in Wenzhou, Zhejiang but partially spent his childhood in Huaihua, Hunan with his grandparents, and later grew up in Shenzhen, Guangdong. During his time in elementary school, he was chosen to be the principal's assistant and student union's president, and partook in various essay writing competitions. Kun was also elected as a candidate for TFBoys, but decided to focus on his academics as his parents thought that he was too young to enter the world of entertainment. After graduating he moved to Shenzhen to complete junior high school at Nashan Experimental High School. Around the age of 16, he studied at Grace Brethren High School in Simi Valley, California, United States.

Career

2012–2014: Start of career 
In April 2012, Kun participated in Hunan TV's variety show Up Young! and ended up in the national top 200, which allowed him to enter the stage. In August of that year, Kun began his acting career, playing the role of Du Yu Feng's teenage version (portrayed by Lee Joon-hyuk) in Half a Fairytale. After that he also played the role of Xixi in Hunan TV's television series "女刑警李春春 (Police Woman Li ChunChun)". In 2014, he played the teenage version of Huo Ke (portrayed by He Jiong) in Lock Me Up, Tie Him Down.

2015–2017: Super Idol (星动亚洲)
In 2015, Kun returned from the U.S. to participate in South-Korean based reality show Super Idol. The show was produced by Anhui TV, in partnership with South-Korean broadcast network MBC. During the two seasons of the show, Kun experienced constant pressure and fierce competition from other participants, receiving intensive idol training. After a period of about two years on the show, Kun's performance skills saw an unprecedented improvement, earning him a spot in the Top 3. Upon the end of Season 2, Kun returned to China, where he debuted as a member of Chinese boy group SWIN under Yihai Entertainment Company. As the group had already accumulated a sizable fan base at the time, the debut was highly anticipated by both the members and their fans. However, due to Yihai's mismanagement, the group rarely had performance opportunities and public appearances, which resulted in a dwindling fan base and popularity. 
In the beginning of 2017, Kun filed a lawsuit against Yihai Entertainment Company to terminate his contract.

2018: Idol Producer (偶像练习生) and rise in popularity
After a period of dormancy from the entertainment industry, Kun decided to join Season 1 of reality survival show Idol Producer as an independent trainee at the end of 2017.

Kun performed his self-written and self-composed song "I Wanna Get Love" in the first episode. Despite some controversy, Kun attracted a large fanbase. He quickly rose to fame and became a hot topic for discussion on the survival show. In addition to receiving considerably high votes after each evaluation performance in the show, Kun also earned rank no. 1 multiple times and maintained a high ranking throughout the entire program. He received a total of 47,640,887 votes in the final evaluation, earning him the center position in the final line-up. On April 6, 2018, Kun officially debuted as the leader and center of temporary Chinese boy group Nine Percent.

Soon after the end of Idol Producer, I Won't Get Bullied by Girls, a web-drama starring Kun, was released, filmed in 2017. Kun took on his first lead role as Ye Lin, the love interest of Ren Xiaoqin (portrayed by Lu Yangyang). The show is a teen comedy series that features a distinctive wardrobe and draws heavy influence from Japanese manga as a means to achieve comic relief. Owing up to Kun's popularity at the time of the release, the series' viewership reached and set new records almost daily. By May 3, it had reached over 5.75 million views.

From April to May 2018, Kun's first single "I Wanna Get Love" had topped the 'Mainland China C-pop Single Chart' as China's number 1 single for almost three weeks.  At the end of May, Kun was voted as one of the most influential celebrities in China. For the three months between May and July, Kun had a full schedule with fan meeting tours across China with Nine Percent. On June 2, Kun and other members of Nine Percent had their first group appearance on the variety show Happy Camp.

In July, Kun set up his own personal studio. On August 2, 2018, his 20th birthday, Kun released the highly anticipated EP "1" for free. His first EP contains three songs, "Pull Up", "You Can Be My Girlfriend", and "It's You". The first track, "Pull Up", became an instant hit and broke 10 records on QQ Music, the largest music streaming platform in China. "Pull Up" was co-written with UK songwriting team Mike Macdermid, David Brant (who is also the producer on the song), Rajiv Bukhory, Fidel Rosales and Ryan Curtis. He also edited the sensational music video for "Pull Up". Kun later released another single, "Wait Wait Wait" on August 23, which quickly rose to the top of multiple music charts. His first stage performance of "Wait Wait Wait" was broadcast on the first episode of Idol Hits on September 7.

On October 12, Kun performed "You Can Be My Girlfriend" live for the first time at the "BAZAAR Stars' Charity Night" and donated 600,000 RMB for Bazaar's charitable project. Over the next two days, Kun, partnered with MiGu Music and successfully held his first set of small-scale fan meetings at Chengdu and Shanghai. On the last day of October, Kun delivered his first stage performance of "Pull Up" at the "Ellemen Movie Hero Gala" in Beijing. On November 7, Nine Percent released their first original song, "Rule Breaker", one of the tracks in their album To the Nines. Kun co-wrote the lyrics of "Rule Breaker" and "Good Things".  Rule Breaker was written by some of the same writers as "Pull Up" namely Mike Macdermid, Rajiv Bukhory, David Brant and in addition, USA based producer Kevin Chozen took the helm on production.

At the Twelfth Annual Migu Music Awards, held on December 8, Kun's "Wait Wait Wait" was ranked one of the Top Ten Pop Songs of the Year. This marked the first major award received by Kun for his musical work. On December 28, TC Candler & The Independent Critics released their highly awaited List of The 100 Most Handsome Faces of 2018, taking into account the large pool of public opinion and suggestions, where Kun has been ranked as having the 27th Most Handsome Face in 2018. On December 30, Kun performed "You Can Be My Girlfriend" and "Wait Wait Wait" at the "Zhejiang TV New Year's Eve Concert". On the very next day, he unveiled his first stage performance of "It's You" at the "Dragon TV New Year's Eve Gala" in Shanghai.

2019: Ambassador of China and Jamaica, new songs and solo tour 
On January 10, 2019, Kun was awarded the title of "China and Jamaica's Goodwill Ambassador" by the Jamaican Embassy in Shanghai, China. With this honorable title, Kun called on mutual cultural exchanges between China and Jamaica. He said that he hopes to become a positive role-model for the younger generation. Less than a week later, the official theme song of the movie The Knight of Shadows: Between Yin and Yang, "The Lunar Song", was released. This song marks a noteworthy collaboration between Kun and renowned cinematic actor and entertainer, Jackie Chan.

On January 18, the first episode of Cai Xukun's Unfinished, a documentary series initiated by Weibo, was released. This short video series spans across various themes close to his heart and is expected to run for 12 episodes. The next day, Kun released an artistic music video for "Wait Wait Wait", directed by Dave Meyers. The award-winning director and his international team created a highly cinematic and storytelling music video using a series of symbolic elements, to allude to the message behind the song.

On February 5, the first day of Chinese New Year in 2019, Kun prepared an exclusive stage performance for Beijing TV's Spring Festival Gala by delivering a song he co-wrote with other musicians. "That Spring" marked the first time he performed a song that was written entirely in Chinese.He later revealed his intention to dedicate the song as an exclusive performance for Beijing TV, and hence he will not be releasing a studio version of it. On the 18th of that month, Kun released his first Chinese single "No Exception". The song was a collaboration between two musicians, with composition by Yoga Lin and lyrics written by Kun. A week later on February 26, an animated music video for "No Exception" was released The music video created by a group of artists from South Korean-based publishing and film-making studio, VCRWORKS, employs abstract elements and snippets from Kun's life to recount his story. Attempting to relate his own story with a personal narrative while being aligned to the overall theme of the song, Kun chose a controlled and melodic singing style when delivering this melancholic ballad. "No Exception" once again rose to the number one position on multiple music charts in China, setting an impressive record on music streaming platforms for 2019.

On March 1, Kun officially announced the dates for his first solo tour "KUN ONE North America/U.K. Tour 2019" to bring his music to fans in Vancouver, San Francisco, Los Angeles, New York, and London from April 4 to April 12, 2019. It is worth noting that the tickets for the Los Angeles and New York shows were sold out online within the first few minutes they went on sale. On March 15, Kun released the first of his first DJ mix, "Bigger" on Spotify and was one of the tracks performed at his solo tour in April. The release date for "Bigger" was slated for March 22 in China.

On April 19, Kun released a song titled "Hard to Get". Prior to the song's release, Kun updated his social media accounts with three photos in succession, captioned 'H', 'T' and 'G'. The song was first performed during his first solo tour. The music video of this song was released a bit later than expected, but it was released on May 3 through Kun's new YouTube Channel. The music video for "Hard to Get" has been viewed for over 10 million times on YouTube and 100 million times on his Weibo.

On May 16, Kun attended the opening ceremony of the Asian Film and TV Week. On May 24 and 25, Kun finished the last two shows of his KUN ONE tour in Toronto and Vancouver.

Kun was invited to be a guest judge for the 11th episode of the World's Got Talent, filmed in Hunan, China. He also delivered a special performance with a mix of "It's You" and "Hard to Get". The episode was broadcast on June 28 and immediately became a Hot Topic on Weibo. For the first time in its history, the program was the Most Discussed Variety Show of the day.

On July 26, Kun released EP Young, which became a huge hit on charts. The music video was filmed in multiple locations around the world including Shanghai, Seoul, Taipei, Beijing and LA. Kun actively took part in the creation process including production, creating ideas for the music video, editing the music video, helping out with the choreography and designing the cover of the EP. Upon release, the song immediately rose up high on charts and currently sold over 63 million copies, which holds the record of the highest digital albums copies sold in 2019. In just 1 minute and 21 seconds the EP achieved 9 of QQ Music's awards and caused the creation of two more certifications. Altogether the EP earned more than 20 million yuan.

On October 31, Kun performed his newest single "Rebirth" (重生) for 2019's Fresh Asia Music Awards and released it on November 15. It was officially re-released in January 2020 as a collaboration with the renowned American producer and DJ Kshmr, this was a breakthrough for Kun as this is the first time he's ever collaborated with a foreign artist on a single. The song expresses Kun's desire to break through his shell and show a fearless side to him. The arrangement creates a sense of emptiness and the mysterious EDM elements are combined with the his bursting attitude. The lyrics were written by Kun himself which makes the song personal to him and describes another step in his journey.

2020: Youth With You and "Lover" 
In the beginning of January 2020, it was announced that Kun would be the Youth Representative of iQiyi's Youth with You Season 2. It is the third season of Chinese survival show Idol Producer, which created Kun's former group Nine Percent from the first season and UNINE from its second season. He was on the show as a mentor alongside Lisa of Blackpink, Ella Chen and Jony J.

In March 2020, Kun and actress Tong Liya released a song titled "The Mountains and Rivers Are on My Chest" (山河无恙在我胸) to help boost the morale of those fighting against the COVID-19 pandemic. In April he joined the cast of "Keep Running" alongside Lucas of WayV/NCT and Yuqi of (G)I-dle.

In April, Kun released the single "Home", a song written to help support those who are under lock-down during the COVID-19 Pandemic. After its release, #蔡徐坤新歌# quickly appeared on Weibo, Douyin, QQ Music, NetEase Cloud Music, Xiami Music and many other popular search lists. The discussion topics have soared and reached the peak popularity list in 20 minutes.

On May 24, Kun released his newest single "Lover", a day after its release "Lover" ranked first on QQ Music's charts. "Lover" was first released to the public on the Chinese survival show Youth with You Season 2 as a collaboration between Kun and the trainees on the show, this version ranked second on QQ Music's charts. Kun co-wrote the song with Ding Yanxue and was composed with the help of Max Ulver, Andreas Ringblom, and Daniel Schulz. In addition, he also co-produced the song with Korean YG producer Choice37. "Lover" was the most downloaded collaboration stage song of the competition with more than 100,000 downloads after its release. Due to its success, the hashtag #情人舞挑战# has been used over 400 million times on Chinese social platforms including Weibo and Douyin, the studio version of the single (without the trainees) has been listened to over 30 million times with 1 million daily listeners.

In 2020, He ranked 31st on Forbes China Celebrity 100 list.

2021: First studio album and Madam Tussauds 
On April 6, 2021, Kun announced on both Weibo and Instagram that his new album would be available soon and released the names of the first 3 tracks of the album as well as the intro: #0000FF on April 9, 2021. The album has exceeded 1 million reservations after 2 hours of release on QQ Music, become the fastest artist to do so in 2021.

On December 16, 2021, Madam Tussauds in Hong Kong revealed Kun's first ever wax figure. The figure wears the outfit Kun wore at World's Got Talent 2019 and joins the attraction's 'Fashion Zone'.

2022 - Present: "Hug Me" 
On July 2, 2022, Kun released the single "Hug Me." The single became a hit, becoming one of the top ten most streamed songs of 2022 on the two major Chinese music platforms, QQ Music and NetEase Cloud Music.

Endorsements and ambassadorships 
In 2018, Kun was chosen to be the brand ambassador for the skin care line by Yoseido, the parent company of Nongfu Spring. He was also named the promotional representative for L'Oréal Paris and a model for the smartphone technological giant Vivo. On October 19, 2018, Aussie of P&G named Kun as their global spokesperson.

On January 1, 2019, Levi's announced that Kun became their brand ambassador. On May 31, Prada named Kun as its China ambassador, making him the first Chinese spokesperson for the brand and a face of its Fall/Winter 2019 advertising campaign. Kun also attended Prada's Menswear Spring 2020 Fashion Show, which was held in Shanghai for the first time. In June, Vivo announced Kun as the brand face for its new S1 mobile series.

In 2020 Kun became the brand ambassador for multiple brands including Kosé, Givenchy Beauty as well as domestic brands such as Proya. Kun has also become the new spokesperson for FILA, an Italian sportswear company, and attended the brand's press conference in Shanghai on July 10, 2020.

In 2021, British fragrance brand Jo Malone appointed Kun as their brand ambassador, along with hair brand Schwarzkopf and other domestic brands.

In 2022, Swiss watches and accessory manufacturer TAG Heuer named Kun its Chinese ambassador, with the brand's chief executive officer Frédéric Arnault stating that "[Kun] has demonstrated remarkable talent in songwriting and performing" in addition to being "incredibly athletic, truly daring and never stops challenging the limits," which matches the brand's mind-set.

Artistry

Influences 
Kun cites his influences to include Stevie Wonder and Lana Del Rey. "I really like the soul and jazz vibe that takes people on an emotional journey in music," he said. This is clearly expressed in his first English track: the pop, electronic, soul mix "Wait Wait Wait," released in August.

Themes and genres 
Kun has composed and produced most of his solo works by himself, including "I Wanna Get Love", his EP "1" and "Wait Wait Wait".  He also co-wrote lyrics of "Rule Breaker" and "Good Things", two tracks from Nine Percent's album "To the Nines". He's said to have very diverse music styles, ranging from Future R&B, Urban R&B, Hip-hop, Pop, Dance to Electronic Soul.

Philanthropy 
Kun has been very active in supporting philanthropies throughout his career.

Back in 2014, he participated as a runner in a fundraising marathon to help autistic children.

In August 2018, Kun donated 32,000 RMB to a private non-profit autism rehabilitation facility for children older than 6 years old. On October 13, 2018, Kun performed at the BAZAAR Stars' Charity Night and donated 600,000 RMB without making it known to the public. Unfortunately, his donation invited massive criticism from haters before a list of donors was published. The raised funds were intended to be for costs of building facilities to allow students in rural areas to pursue different extracurricular activities, such as learning music.

In addition, Kun often uses his Weibo account with over 33 million followers as a platform to encourage his fans to participate in and do their part for good causes, such as making donations to support the fight against leukemia.

On November 29, 2018, Kun paired up with a traditional musician from the Yi ethnic group in Sichuan and filmed a short program for the "Tracing the Influence of Music" project organized by MiGu Music. The idea of the project was to raise awareness, preserve distinctive music cultures and instruments from ancient China.

In December 2018, Kun joined the Star Lights "Battle Against Poverty" project, a charity movement initiated by Jackie Chan, which has garnered the support of many A-list Chinese celebrities. Along with a crew of cameramen from Chinese television channel CCTV-6, Kun visited a poverty-stricken area on Hainan Island to film his efforts as part of the Star Lights "Battle Against Poverty" project. Through a live broadcast, Kun introduced local specialities and agricultural products to viewers across the country, hoping to boost tourism and increase the sales of local products, one of which was the salted duck egg. With Kun's popularity and positive influence, fans rushed to purchase these mentioned duck eggs, which led to all 80,000 eggs being sold out within a minute. "Cai Xukun's fans, please give the ducks some time" immediately became a trending topic on Weibo.

With Kun's advocacy for philanthropy, his fans have made significant contribution to different charity causes, including donations for purchasing school supplies and building a new road in rural villages. By the end of 2018, the total of charitable donations made by individual fans and fan clubs was approximately 5,000,000 RMB.

On May 12, 2019, Kun was named the Goodwill Ambassador of China Foundation for Poverty Alleviation. He pledged to promote the social awareness for disaster prevention programs. On June 16, Ullens Center for Contemporary Art announced that Kun would be its Arts and Philanthropy Ambassador, promoting educational programs for underserved children. On June 17, an earthquake measuring 5.8 MW struck the province of Sichuan in China, killing 13 people and injuring over 200 others. 
On June 20, Kun donated 100,000 RMB to support post-earthquake relief efforts and added another 30,000 RMB worth of books and school supplies for Gaoshankao Primary School.

Kun launched a charity fund to support impoverished children in Chinese remote areas on October 17, 2019. He donated over 600,000 RMB and stated that he will continue to donate 3 million RMB in the next three years, which will mainly be used to sponsor primary school choirs in these areas and will also provide support to other activities of other charities as part of the foundation's Spring Bud Plan implementation.

It was revealed that Kun donated 600,000 RMB on January 26, 2020, as support for medical purposes for those who were infected by the coronavirus outbreak in Wuhan, China. With Kun's constant dedication towards charity, his fan clubs also raised a fund, which reached more than 500,000 RMB and was donated to the same cause.

Lawsuits over contract dispute 
On February 10, 2017, Kun filed a lawsuit against his then-company, Shanghai Yihai Entertainment, for poor treatment and the right to terminate his contract. Yihai was allegedly in arrears and members of SWIN were said to have to pay for all expenses of their activities, including but not limited to, their albums and fan meetings without being reimbursed. Furthermore, Yihai demanded that each member sign a Debt Acknowledgment Letter for 1.1 million RMB (approximately US$165,000) to share the production costs for Season 2 of Super Idol. In addition, the boys had to sign an Amendment to their original contract within an hour of notice. This new document not only severely shrank the share of the artists' pay, but also extended the term of their contracts.

Soon after the broadcast of Idol Producer, Yihai filed another case in March 2018, to countersue Kun for the breach of contract, asking that he pay the company 1.1 million RMB for liquidated damages and compensation for their losses. Meanwhile, Yihai demanded for Kun to continue to abide by the terms in the contract, allowing the former to be entitled to 70% of the income Kun earns from dramas, endorsements and variety shows.

In October 2018, the Court of First Instance rendered a decision favoring Kun, prompting Yihai Entertainment to submit an appeal. In January 2019, a second trial was held. The court did not announce the verdict until February, with the final ruling issued on February 19, 2019. iQiyi released an exclusive report stating that the two-year dispute between Kun and Yihai has finally been settled, with Kun winning the case, hence being free from his contract.

Controversy 
On January 18, 2019, the NBA announced that Kun would be its first Chinese New Year greeting ambassador and released a holiday commercial featuring Kun as a basketball fan alongside three NBA star players. This led to subsequent rumors including a false claim that Kun was appointed an Ambassador of NBA, which some considered to be an insult to the sport. Parody videos based on an earlier dance and basketball clip from Kun's time in Idol Producer were circulated in response to said rumors; some included gore and violence. As many such videos were hosted on the Chinese video website Bilibili, Kun's Studio subsequently issued a legal notice to Bilibili to facilitate the possibility of legal recourse against the creators of videos, arguing that they amounted to harassment, defamation and/or an infringement of Kun's rights. However, the legal threat resulted in an escalation of the controversy; "to issue a legal notice" quickly became a popular Internet meme, even amongst those who were otherwise unfamiliar with Kun. Kun's fans experienced harassment both on and offline, to the point where Kun and his fans are sometimes used as an example of victims of cyberbullying.

Discography

Studio albums

Extended plays

Singles

Other charted songs

Soundtrack appearances

Collaborations

Filmography

Films

Television series

Television shows

Awards and nominations

Forbes China Celebrity 100

Notes

References

External links

Kun's Official Channel on YouTube

1998 births
Living people
People from Huaihua
Idol Producer contestants
Nine Percent members
21st-century Chinese male actors
Chinese DJs
Chinese male film actors
Chinese male dancers
Chinese male rappers
Chinese male television actors
Chinese Mandopop singers
Chinese philanthropists
Chinese rhythm and blues singers
Chinese male singer-songwriters
Male actors from Hunan
Singers from Hunan
Songwriters from Hunan